Studentification may refer to:

 The phenomenon in which a growing student population move in large numbers to traditionally non-student neighborhoods; see College town;
 Studentization — adjustment of a statistic by dividing it by a sample-based estimate of its standard deviation.